Sugar Tree Ridge is an unincorporated community in Highland County, in the U.S. state of Ohio.

History
A post office called Sugar Tree Ridge was established in 1837. The community was named for a ridge with many sugar maple trees near the original town site.

References

Unincorporated communities in Highland County, Ohio
Unincorporated communities in Ohio